Felicity Lesley Wilson (born 7 June 1982) is an Australian politician. She has been a member of the New South Wales Legislative Assembly representing the electoral district of North Shore for the Liberal Party since 2017.

Wilson was first elected on 8 April 2017 at the North Shore state by-election held to replace the previous member, former Minister for Health Jillian Skinner, and was re-elected on 23 March 2019 at the general election. She is Chair of the Legislation Review Committee, and Deputy Chair of both the Environment and Planning Committee and the Electoral Matters Committee.

Early life and background 
Wilson was born in 1982 in Cessnock as the youngest of 3 children. She lives in Cremorne with her husband and their 2 children, both born since her election to parliament.

In her inaugural speech to the Parliament, she spoke about her turbulent childhood due to her father's undiagnosed schizophrenia which led to violence experienced by her and her sisters. She pledged her commitment to addressing the stigma associated with mental illness.

She went to Nulkaba Public School until her family circumstances required her to move to the Central Coast where she finished primary school and started high school, later completing her secondary education at Tara Anglican School for Girls after receiving an academic scholarship.

She holds a Master of Public Policy from the University of Sydney and a Bachelor of Media from Macquarie University. Prior to her election, she was studying a Master of Business Administration at the Australian Graduate School of Management at the University of New South Wales as a recipient of the AGSM Excellence Scholarship, including a term completed at the University of Chicago Booth School of Business.

Before entering politics, Wilson was a corporate affairs director for Broadspectrum, and had previously worked in executive and corporate affairs roles at the Property Council of Australia and Caltex.

Prior to her election, Wilson served as Vice President of the NSW Liberal Party and as President of the Liberal Women's Council (NSW) from 2012 to 2015.

Political career 

Wilson provided incorrect information in a statutory declaration and 'solemn declaration' when she falsely claimed to have lived in the North Shore constituency for a decade. In relation to that affair, a sub-committee of the Mosman branch of the Liberal Party recorded that it had been left 'unimpressed by the apparent evasiveness of many answers' on Wilson's part, 'together with the lack of contrition for any embarrassment caused to the party'.

In a separate scandal, Wilson admitted to providing false information on political forms having overstated the number of undergraduate university degrees that she held. Ms Wilson claimed she had a double degree from Macquarie University when she applied to be vice-president of the NSW Liberal state executive in 2013. However, she later admitted to holding only one undergraduate degree.

Despite a 16.5% swing against the Liberals on a two-candidate preferred basis, Wilson was elected on 8 April 2017 at the North Shore state by-election held to replace the previous member, Jillian Skinner.

In 2018, while heavily pregnant with her first child, Wilson was challenged for preselection by the hard-right's Tim James, who had lost preselection to Wilson first in 2017. Wilson was strongly supported by the Premier Gladys Berejiklian along with the moderate wing of the Liberal Party.

Wilson is known to support action on climate change and had been an advocate for women's rights including supporting legislation to decriminalise abortion & introduce safe access zones around abortion clinics. The preselection was influenced by the heavy presence of right-wing Liberal Party members installed in support of Tony Abbott in the overlapping Federal electorate of Warringah. After Wilson narrowly won the vote, James and right-wing supporters chose to challenge the preselection in the NSW Supreme Court.  However, his case was dismissed.

Wilson suffered a 10.1% swing against her on a two-candidate preferred basis at the 2019 election, but retained her seat.

External links 
 Inaugural speech to NSW Parliament

References

Living people
Members of the New South Wales Legislative Assembly
Liberal Party of Australia members of the Parliament of New South Wales
Women members of the New South Wales Legislative Assembly
1982 births
21st-century Australian politicians
21st-century Australian women politicians